Les Grands Moulins is a mountain in Savoie department in the French Alps.   Les Grands Moulins can be climbed by hiking the trail on South face of the mountain.

References

Mountains of the Alps
Mountains of Savoie